Stephanie Sy-Quia (born 1995) is a British–American writer. Born in California and now living in London, Sy-Quia attended the King's School, Canterbury then went on to study English at Oxford.
 
She has written for publications including The Guardian, The White Review, Boston Review, Granta, Los Angeles Review of Books, The London Magazine, Tribune Mag, and The TLS. Sy-Quia is a Ledbury Poetry Critic and has been shortlisted for the Bodley Head Essay Prize. 

Her debut poetry collection, Amnion, was published by Granta in 2021 and won the Forward Prize for Poetry (Best First Collection, 2022), Somerset Maugham Award, Eric Gregory Award, and was the Poetry Book Society's Winter Recommendation. Amnion was also longlisted for the Rathbones Folio and RSL Ondaatje Prizes

References

External links 
 https://muckrack.com/stephanie-sy-quia

People educated at The King's School, Canterbury
1995 births
Living people
American writers